The 2009 Southeast Asian Games (translit. Kila phoumipak asi taven oak siang tai 2009), officially known as the 25th Southeast Asian Games, was a Southeast Asian multi-sport event hosted by Vientiane, Laos. This was the first time Laos had held the Southeast Asian Games as Laos had previously declined hosting the 1965 Southeast Asian Peninsular Games, citing financial difficulties. This was also the first time the Southeast Asian Games was held in a landlocked country.

The games commemorated 50 years of SEA Games and the main schedule was formally held from 9 to 18 December 2009, with several events had commenced from 2 December 2009. Around 3,100 athletes participated at the event, which featured 372 events in 25 sports. Laos is the ninth nation to host the games after Thailand, Myanmar, Malaysia, Singapore, Indonesia, Philippines, Brunei and Vietnam. It was opened by Choummaly Sayasone, the President of Laos at the New Laos National Stadium.

The final medal tally was led by Thailand, followed by  Vietnam and Indonesia with host Laos in seventh place. Several Games and national records were broken during the games.

Host city

During the Southeast Asian Games Federation meeting at the 2003 Southeast Asian Games in Vietnam, Vientiane, the capital city of Laos was chosen as the host of the 2009 Southeast Asian Games.

Development and preparation

The Laos 25th SEA Games Organising Committee (LAOSOC) led by president Somsavath Lengsavath was formed to oversee the staging of the games.

Branding

The logo of the 2009 Southeast Asian Games is the image of the Pha That Luang, the national landmark and shrine of Laos beside the Mekong River. The shrine represents Laos as the host of the 2009 Southeast Asian Games and the Lao Culture, Arts and History, whereas the Mekong River, resembled by three wavy lines below the shrine, represents the origin of life, culture and lifestyle of Lao community especially in sports. The river itself also represents the integration of the Southeast Asian countries and the friendship made through sport events.

The mascots of the 2009 Southeast Asian Games are two white elephants dressed in traditional Lao attire named Champa and Champi. Champa is the male elephant and Champi is the female elephant. The elephants symbolises the host nation, Laos as it was known as the kingdom of Lan Xang in ancient times, which literally means "the kingdom of a million elephants". The cheerful expression on the faces of the mascots represents the joyful and lively atmosphere during the games and warm welcome from Laos as the host country of the 25th SEA Games.

33 songs were written for the games, which included The Spirit of the Flame, the theme song of the games which was written and performed by Sam Intharaphithak. Other songs included "Go Laos" which was sung by Sam Intharaphithak, Nalin Daravong, and Kave, "SEA Games Harmony" which was sung by Sithiphone, Sam Intharaphithak, Gai, Malya and Poui and "Vientiane Games" which was sung by Buratino. A Beerlao Campaign song for the games was also composed.

Countdown

The countdown to the 25th SEA Games was held at the Chao Anouvong stadium on 31 December 2008, featured programmes such as the New Year celebrations, a show from Miss SEA Games contestants, performances by various artists, and a fireworks display. A countdown clock was also placed at a nearby shopping mall and the Patuxay Monument in Vientiane.

Venues

The 2009 Southeast Asian Games used mostly new and some existing venues with the centrepiece of the activities being the new National Sport Complex. Incorporating the new 25,000-seat national stadium, it hosted most of the events. Athletes were housed at the National University of Laos, which was chosen as the games village.

The 25th Southeast Asian Games had 27 venues for the games, all in Vientiane.

Public transport

Lao Association of Travel Agents provided bus services during the Games to fetch volunteers between the city and outlying venues and transport athletes and performers to and from the games village, airport, the city, the games venues and within Laos. Car services were also available in the city throughout the games period.

The games

Opening ceremony

The opening ceremony of the 2009 Southeast Asian Games was held on 9 December 2009 at 18:10 (LST) at the New Laos National Stadium. The ceremony preceded with the arrival of the then President Choummaly Sayasone and several guests of honour to the stadium including Prime Minister Hun Sen of Cambodia, Prime Minister Thein Sein of Myanmar, Prime Minister Abhisit Vejjajiva of Thailand and Prime Minister Nguyen Tan Dung of Vietnam. This was followed by announcement of the ceremony commencement by announcers, the scoreboard countdown and the parade of athletes from the participating nations led by Lao Police Force band and flag bearers carrying the flags of the games and the flags of the participating nations began with the Bruneian delegation. The Lao delegation, the largest of all participating nations with 733 athletes and officials, received the warmest welcome from the audiences when they marched into the stadium. After all the contingent marched into the stadium, the National Flag of Laos and the games' flags were raised as the National Anthem of Laos is played. After that, Somsavat Lengsavad, the Standing Deputy Prime Minister of Laos and the chairman of the 25th Southeast Asian Games Organizing Committee gave the welcome speech and president Choummaly then declared the games opened. Mayuly Phanouvong took the athlete's oath, while the judge's oath was taken by Somphone Manikham. Later, a group of athletes passes the flame during the torch relay one after another before Phoxay Aphailath, lit the flame on an arrow carried by a man dressed as Sang Sinxay. The man who dressed as Sang Sinxay then aim the arrow lit by the flame from Phoxay with his bow carried with him at the cauldron, shoot and lit it instantly, symbolised the beginning of the games. After the cauldron was lit, the athletes took part at the parade earlier were escorted out of the stadium by the Lao Police Force, making way for the dance performance which concluded the ceremony. The dance performance includes segments such as Welcome dance for SEA Games, Forest, streams and life, Sinxay of Modern Times, Bright Future, In Harmony towards the future, Golden rice field and the light of righteousness.

Closing ceremony

The closing ceremony of the 2009 Southeast Asian Games was held on 18 December 2009 at 18:10 (LST) at the New Laos National Stadium. The ceremony preceded with the arrival of the then Prime Minister Bouasone Bouphavanh and several guests of honour to the stadium. It began with the parade of athletes by order of sports competed, followed by the closing speech of the games chairman, Songsavad Lengsavad, the lowering of the flag of Laos and the games flag and the extinguish of the games cauldron. The hosting rights of the SEA Games was then handed over to Indonesia, host of the 2011 Southeast Asian Games in which Andy Mallarangeng, the Minister of Youth and sports of Indonesia receiving the flag as its symbol. The Indonesia segment dance performance Gather together again, was performed by Indonesian dancers. The ceremony concluded with the Lao farewell segment dance performance which included Paddy Trash, Lao New Year, Rocket Festival and boat racing festival.

Participating nations

 
 
 
  (Host)

Sports
Because of the limited sports facilities in Vientiane and Laos' lack of a coastline, only 25 sports featured in the programme, compared to 43 held in the 2007 Southeast Asian Games in Thailand. Among the Olympic sports removed from the Games were baseball, canoeing, sailing, gymnastics, hockey, rowing, fencing, triathlon, equestrian, softball, and basketball.

 
 
 
ʰ
 
 
 
 
 ¹
 
 
 
 
 
 ¹
 
 
 
 ¹
 
 ʰ
 
 
 
 
 
 
 ¹

Key
¹ – non-Olympic sports
ʰ – sports absent from previous edition and reintroduced by the host country

Calendar

Medal table
A total of 1246 medals, comprising 372 gold medals, 374 silver medals, and 500 bronze medals were awarded to athletes. The Host Laos performance was its best ever yet in Southeast Asian Games history and was placed seventh overall amongst participating nations.

Broadcasting

The games were broadcast live on 14 radio and television channels and websites in six countries.

Brunei
 Radio Television Brunei

Laos
 Lao National Television, Lao Star Television, Lao National Radio

Myanmar
 MRTV-4

Singapore
 Mediacorp Channel 5

Thailand
 National Broadcasting Services of Thailand, Channel 7 (Thailand), Royal Thai Army Radio and Television Channel 5, TOT Public Company Limited, CAT Telecom, Thai Public Broadcasting Service

Vietnam
 Vietnam Multimedia Corporation, Vietnam Television

Malaysia's TV3 and TV2 only broadcast the Games' Men's Football events.

Concerns, controversies and legacy

Prior to the games, the Laotian organising committee was criticised for reducing the number of sports. This had been done partly because Laos has no coastline (rendering sailing, windsurfing, and triathlon infeasible), and a general lack of sporting facilities in Vientiane. The inclusion of a number of Olympic sports, previously uncontested at the SEA Games, were interpreted as a bid for greater coverage of the Games in Laos. Few critics stated that Laos specifically selected games in which they had a better chance of winning gold medals. The decision to remove basketball from the programme was an unpopular one.

Many countries, including the Philippines – the defending champions for the men's division – offered to help to host the Games but Laos rejected these offers. Laos accepted funding from China, Japan, Vietnam and the ASEAN nations to construct the appropriate sports facilities  including the USD 100 million New Laos National Stadium and USD 19 million Games village. Although prior criticisms had been levelled over the reduced programme and financing of facilities, upon commencement, the Games received a largely positive reaction from the other competing nations. The Games were considered a success for Laos, one of the poorest countries in the world, and a nation which had only sent four athletes to the 2008 Olympic Games.

References

External links
 2009 Southeast Asian Games official website
 25th SEA Games Laos Official Report Part 1
 25th SEA Games Laos Official Report Part 2 
 2009 Southeast Asian Games Utusan Malaysia Special Coverage Page

 
2009
Multi-sport events in Laos
International sports competitions hosted by Laos
2009 in Asian sport
2009 in Laotian sport
2009 in multi-sport events
21st century in Vientiane